In enzymology, a tryptophan alpha,beta-oxidase is an enzyme that catalyzes the chemical reaction

L-tryptophan + O2  alpha,beta-didehydrotryptophan + H2O2

Thus, the two substrates of this enzyme are L-tryptophan and O2, whereas its two products are alpha,beta-didehydrotryptophan and H2O2.

This enzyme belongs to the family of oxidoreductases, specifically those acting on the CH-CH group of donor with oxygen as acceptor.  The systematic name of this enzyme class is L-tryptophan:oxygen alpha,beta-oxidoreductase. Other names in common use include L-tryptophan 2',3'-oxidase, and L-tryptophan alpha,beta-dehydrogenase.  It employs one cofactor, heme.

References

 
 

EC 1.3.3
Heme enzymes
Enzymes of unknown structure